Port Alma is a coastal town, locality and port in the Rockhampton Region, Queensland, Australia.

Geography 

The locality is bounded to the north by the Fitzroy River, to the north-east by Keppel Bay and to the east and south-east by Raglan Creek. The town is situated on the east of the locality on the western bank of Raglan Creek.

Much of the locality is almost at sea level and is mostly undeveloped marshland.

Islands 
Casuarina Creek and a number of other small creeks form the Fitzroy River delta, which creates a number of low-lying islands, shoals, and channels within the locality including:

 Alligator Passage
 Casuarina Island
 Dunlop Island
 Egg Sand, a marine bank
 Jacks Island
 Mosquito Island
 Pugh Sand, a sand bar
 Sandfly Island
 Satellite Channel 

Headlands 
Port Alma has the following headlands on its coastline:

 Bunyip Point
 Eupatoria Point
 False Point
 Gayden Point
 Iguana Point
 Pile Point
 Rocky Point
 Saurian Point
 Shell Point
 Woods Point

History 
The town was named by hydrographer, Commander J. Jeffrey of HM Colonial Schooner Pearl, in 1864 after a battle site of the  Crimean War.

The Port Alma railway line was a  branch railway from Bajool railway station on the North Coast railway line to the port at Port Alma. It opened in 1912 to provide access to the port from Rockhampton. The last 10 km of the line closed in 1986, with the remainder serving a salt works until closure in 1990. There were two railway stations on the line, now both dismantled:

 CQ Salt railway station
 Port Alma railway station

Economy 
There are two main aspects to the economy in Port Alma: salt production and a cargo port.

Salt production occurs in large evaporation pans in the locality. The area is the major supplier of salt in Queensland and for the further export. The salt is used for human consumption, for swimming pools, and for industrial processes.

The port is at the town and primarily handles cargoes consisting of class 1 explosives, ammonium nitrate, bulk tallow and equipment used in support of military exercises held at Shoalwater Bay.

Education 
There are no schools in Port Alma. The nearest government primary schools are Bajool State School in neighbouring Bajool to the west and Marmor State School in neighbouring Marmor to the south. The nearest government secondary schools are Mount Larcom State School (to Year 10) in Mount Larcom to the south-east and Rockhampton State High School in Wandal, Rockhampton, to the north-west.

Amenities 
There are three boat ramps in Port Alma. Two are managed by the Rockhampton Regional Council:

 Casuarina Creek boat ramp and floating walkway on Port Alama Road

 Inkerman Creek boat ramp and floating walkway on Port Alma Road

Raglan Creek boat ramp is on Port Alma Road on the north bank of Raglan Creek. It is managed by Transport and Main Roads.

References

Further reading

External links 

 

Towns in Queensland
Suburbs of Rockhampton Region
Alma
Localities in Queensland